The 2008 Zenit St.Petersburg season was the club's fourteenth season in the Russian Premier League, the highest tier of association football in Russia. 
Domestically, Zenit finished fifth in the Russian Premier League, reached the Fifth round of the 2008–09 Russian Cup and won the Russian Super Cup. In Europe, Zenit won the 2007–08 UEFA Cup and the 2008 UEFA Super Cup before finishing third in their Champions League group.

Squad

Out on loan

Transfers

In

Out

Loans out

Released

Friendlies

Competitions

Overall record

Russian Super Cup

UEFA Super Cup

Premier League

Results by round

Results

League table

Russian Cup

UEFA Cup

Final

UEFA Champions League

Group stage

Squad statistics

Appearances and goals

|-
|colspan="14"|Players away from the club on loan:
|-
|colspan="14"|Players who left Zenit St.Petersburg during the season:
|}

Goal scorers

Clean sheets

Disciplinary record

References 

Zenit Saint Petersburg
2008
2007-08 FC Zenit Saint Petersburg season